Everything but the Girl is a compilation album by British musical duo Everything but the Girl. It was released in 1984 in the US and Canada by Sire Records, serving as the band's debut album in those countries. It contains six tracks from their United Kingdom debut Eden, two UK singles and four B-sides.

Background and release 
Everything but the Girl was only released in the United States, Canada, and a few other countries, such as Brazil. It consists of six tracks from Eden plus B-sides and non-album UK singles. In the several months gap between recording and releasing Eden, Thorn and Watt opened themselves to new influences, mostly the Smiths, with whom they also became close. This influence can be heard in "Never Could Have Been Worse" (released as a B-side to "Each and Every One" in the UK).

Other new songs include "Mine", which was released as a single in the UK (where it reached No. 58) only four weeks after Eden, and marked a departure from the album's themes and sound, with Thorn singing about a single mother and gender politics involved in surnames. The other single "Native Land", which featured the Smith's Johnny Marr on harmonica, only reached No. 73. The album completes its track listing with "Easy as Sin", "Riverbed Dry" (B-sides to "Mine" and "Native Land"), "Never Could Have Been Worse" and "Laugh You Out the Hose" (B-sides to "Each and Every One").

Track listing

Personnel
Everything but the Girl
Tracey Thorn – acoustic guitar, vocals
Ben Watt – guitar, piano, Hammond organ, vocals
Additional musicians
Bosco DeOliveira – percussion
Dick Pearce – flugelhorn, trumpet
Nigel Nash – tenor saxophone
Peter King – alto saxophone
Charles Hayward – drums
Chucho Merchán – double bass
Simon Booth – guitar
Bill Le Sage – vibraphone
Johnny Marr – harmonica on "Native Land"
Phil Moxham – bass
Dave Smith – double bass
Bob Sydor – tenor saxophone
June Miles-Kingston – drums, vocals

References

1984 compilation albums
Everything but the Girl compilation albums
Sire Records albums
Jangle pop albums
Indie pop albums by English artists